Tristan Hollard (born 23 November 1996) is an Australian competitive swimmer who specializes in the backstroke events. He currently represents the DC Trident which is part of the International Swimming League.

International career

International Swimming League (ISL) 
Hollard was a member of the inaugural International Swimming League (ISL) representing DC Trident. He competed at the first two matches held in Indianapolis, Indiana, and Naples, Italy, respectively, as well as in the American Derby held in College Park, Maryland.

References

Australian male backstroke swimmers
1996 births
Living people
Swimmers at the 2020 Summer Olympics
21st-century Australian people